The puddingwife wrasse, Halichoeres radiatus, is a species of wrasse native to the western Atlantic Ocean from North Carolina to Bermuda, through the West Indies and Gulf of Mexico, to offshore islands of Brazil, being absent from Brazilian coastal waters. This species can reach   in total length, though most do not exceed . This species is of minor importance to local commercial fisheries and can be found in the aquarium trade.

References

External links
 

Puddingwife wrasse
Fish of the Atlantic Ocean
Fish described in 1758
Labridae
Taxa named by Carl Linnaeus